Mux is a video technology company headquartered in San Francisco, California. Mux focuses on video streaming infrastructure software and video performance analytics.

History 
Mux was founded in 2015 by Jonathan Dahl, Steve Heffernan, Matthew McClure, and Adam Brown. Jonathan Dahl and Steve Heffernan are the founders of Zencoder, a cloud encoding company sold to Brightcove in 2012. The name “Mux” is short for “multiplexing,” a reference to combining multiple signals into one in digital media.

Mux has raised a total of $11.8m from Accel Partners, YCombinator, Lowercase Capital, Susa Ventures, SV Angel, and more. Mux is member of Heavybit and went through the YCombinator program in 2016.

Mux’s first product was a quality of service (QoS) analytics platform to measure a viewer’s experience while watching video. In 2018, Mux announced an API for video streaming using per-title encoding, a technique similar to that used by Netflix.

References 

Y Combinator companies